Durov or Durova may refer to:

Durov
 Anatoly Durov (1887–1928), a Russian animal trainer
 Lev Durov (1931-2015), a Soviet theatre and film actor
 Andrei Durov (b. 1977), a Russian professional footballer
 Pavel Durov (b. 1984), a Russian entrepreneur & VK.com creator
 Nikolai Durov (b. 1980), a Russian mathematician and programmer

Durova
 Nadezhda Durova (1783 – 1866), a woman who became a decorated soldier in the Russian army
 Natalya Durova  (1934 - 2007), a Russian/Soviet circus performer and animal trainer

Russian-language surnames